Bert Rosenbloom is an American business professor and author, currently the J. Ronald Rauth Chair of Marketing Management at Bennett S. LeBow College of Business, Drexel University.

References

American economists
American business writers
Drexel University faculty
Year of birth missing (living people)
Living people